Mansa Uli, also known as Yérélinkon, was the second mansa of the Mali Empire. He was the son and successor of Sunjata.

Uli was one of the greatest rulers of Mali. The 20th-century historian Nehemia Levtzion suggested that Uli may have been the first mansa of Mali to extend his rule to Walata, Timbuktu, and Gao, though Timbuktu and Gao are usually regarded as later additions to the empire.

Uli went on the hajj at some point between 1260 and 1277.

Uli was apparently succeeded by his brother Wati, who is not attested by oral tradition. Some oral traditions assert that Uli was Sunjata's only biological son, though Sunjata may have adopted others.

Uli had a son, Qu, who would gain the throne during the early 14th century.

Footnotes

References

Bibliography

.

Mansas of Mali
1270 deaths
People of the Mali Empire
13th-century monarchs in Africa
Year of birth unknown
Keita family